Ulla Petersen (born 27 May 1933) is a Danish equestrian. She competed at the 1972 Summer Olympics and the 1976 Summer Olympics.

References

1933 births
Living people
Danish female equestrians
French dressage riders
Olympic equestrians of Denmark
Equestrians at the 1972 Summer Olympics
Equestrians at the 1976 Summer Olympics
Sportspeople from Aalborg